Penghu Shuixian Temple, is a Taoist temple in Magong, Penghu. Built in 1696 by Xue Kui (薛奎), a military officer of Penghu Navy, it mainly serves the Shuixian Zunwang, five Taoist immortals worshipped as sea gods.

This building is also called as "Taixiajiao Kongsi" (Chinese:臺廈郊會館; pinyin:Tái xià jiāo huìguǎn) because it was used as a commercial hall which dealt with the trading between Taiwan main island and Xiamen during the late of Qing Dynasty. According to the Chorography of Penghu, Shuixian Temple is one of 4 ancient temples in Penghu County.

History 
After Xue Kui built this temple in 1696, Shuixian Temple also was erected on 1780 and 1821, according to the Chorography of Penghu by Lin Hao (Chinese:林豪; pinyin: Lín háo).

In 1875, there were many local merchants who organized a company (Taixiajiao Kongsi), which was responsible for the business or coordination. The merchants donated the rebuilding of Penghu Shuixian Temple, therefore, their kongsi merged with the temple.

This temple was set up as two-storied house on 1929 (Shōwa the 4th year, Empire of Japan). That time, this building was separated into two different functions, merchants used the 1st floor as their office, and the 2nd floor still kept the space of religion.

Gallery

See also 
 Shuixian Zunwang 
 Magong Mazu Temple
 Magong Beiji Temple
 Magong Chenghuang Temple
 Penghu Guanyin Temple
 List of temples in Taiwan

References 

Taoist temples in Taiwan
Temples in Penghu County